In situ chemical reduction (ISCR) is a new type of environmental remediation technique used for soil and/or groundwater remediation to reduce the concentrations of targeted environmental contaminants to acceptable levels.  It is the mirror process of In Situ Chemical Oxidation (ISCO). ISCR is usually applied in the environment by injecting chemically reductive additives in liquid form into the contaminated area or placing a solid medium of chemical reductants in the path of a contaminant plume. It can be used to remediate a variety of organic compounds, including some that are resistant to natural degradation.

The in situ in ISCR is just Latin for "in place", signifying that ISCR is a chemical reduction reaction that occurs at the site of the contamination. Like ISCO, it is able to decontaminate many compounds, and, in theory, ISCR could be more effective in ground water remediation than ISCO.

Chemical reduction is one half of a redox reaction, which results in the gain of electrons. One of the reactants in the reaction becomes oxidized, or loses electrons, while the other reactant becomes reduced, or gains electrons. In ISCR, reducing compounds, compounds that accept electrons given by other compounds in a reaction, are used to change the contaminants into harmless compounds.

History
Early work, chlorinated substances were treated with copper.  Substrates included DDT, endrin, chloroform, and hexachlorocyclopentadiene to name a few. His work has been the basis of ISCR today. Aluminum and magnesium can produce the same effect in the laboratory, ground water treatment most generally focuses on the use of iron.

Reductants

Zero valent metals (ZVMs)

Zero Valent Metals are the main reductants used in ISCR. The most common metal used is iron, in the form of ZVI (zero valent iron), and it is also the metal longest in use. However, some studies show that zero valent zinc (ZVZ) could actually be up to ten times more effective at eradicating the contaminants than ZVI. Some applications of ZVMs are to clean up Trichloroethylene (TCE) and Hexavalent chromium (Cr(VI)). ZVMs are usually implemented by a permeable reactive barrier. For example, iron that has been embedded in a swellable, organically modified silica creates a permanent soft barrier underground to capture and reduce small, organic compounds as groundwater passes through it.

Iron minerals
Many iron minerals can actively be used in dechlorination. These minerals use . Particular minerals that can be used include green rust, magnetite, pyrite, and glauconite. The most reactive of the iron minerals are the iron sulfides and oxides. Pyrite, an iron sulfide, is able to dechlorinate carbon tetrachloride in suspension.

Polysulfides
Polysulfides are compounds that have chains of sulfur atoms. This is a relatively new reactant, but it has been tested on the field in treating TCE and in comparison to EHC. The use of Polysulfides is a type of abiotic reduction and works best in anaerobic conditions where iron (III) is available. The benefit of using polysulfides is that they do not produce any biological waste products; however, the reaction rates are slow and they require more time to create the DVI (dual valent iron) minerals that are needed for the reduction to occur.

Dithionite
Dithionite can also be used as a reductant. It is usually used in addition to iron reduce contaminants. A number of reactions take place and eventually the contaminant is removed. In the process, ditionite is consumed and the final product of all the reactions is 2 sulfur dioxide anions. The dithionite is not stable for a long period of time.

Bimetallic materials

Bimetallic materials are materials that are made out of two different metals or alloys that are tightly bonded together. A good example of a bimetallic material would be a bimetallic strip which is used in some kinds of thermometers. In ISCR, bimetallic materials are small pieces of metals that are coated lightly with a catalyst such as palladium, silver, or platinum. The catalyst drives a faster reaction and the small size of the particles allows them to effectively move into and remain in the target zone.

Proprietary materials
One proprietary material present today for ISCR is the EHC technology created by Adventus. This particular product is actually a mixture of carbon, nutrients, and zero-valent iron. The theory behind this product is that the carbon in the mixture will promote bacterial growth in the subsurface. The growing bacteria consume oxygen, which easily accepts electrons, present in the subsurface which increases reducing potential. The growing bacteria also ferment and produce fatty acids that act as electron donors to other bacteria and substances. Adventus uses this combination of biotic and abiotic processes to implement ISCR. EHC is injected as a "slurry" (a mixture that is 15 to 40% solids and weight with the rest being liquid) into the substratum.

Another material worth mentioning is EZVI (emulsified ZVI) which is a NASA technology. EZVI is used mainly to treat halogenated hydrocarbons and DNAPLs. EZVI is nanoscale iron that is placed into a biodegradable oil emulsion. The emulsion is then injected into the substratum.

Reactions in ISCR

Reductive processes
In ISCR, many reductive processes can take place. There are hydrogenolysis, β-elimination, hydrogenation, α-elimination, and electron transfer. The specific combination of reductive processes that actually take place in the subsurface depends on the species of contaminant that is present and also the type of reduction being used. The natural and biological processes that take place in the substratum also affect the kinds of reductive processes that are found.

Surface catalyzed reactions

The reactions that occur with permeable reactive barriers and ferrous iron are surface based. The surface reactions take three different forms: direct reduction, electron shunting through ferrous iron, and reduction by production and reaction of hydrogen. Pathway A represents direct electron transfer (ET) for Fe0 to the adsorbed halocarbon (RX) at the metal/water point of contact, resulting in dechlorination and production of Fe2+. Pathway B shows that Fe2+ (resulting from corrosion of Fe0) may also dechlorinate RX, producing Fe3+. Pathway C shows that H2 from the anaerobic corrosion of Fe2+ might react with RX if a catalyst is present.

Enhancement of reductive pathways
The reductive processes discussed above can be enhanced in two ways. One is by increasing the amount of usable iron in the subsurface to increase the rate of the reduction by chemical or biological means. The second method is to enhance the reducing ability of the iron by coupling it with other chemical reductants or using biological reduction with it. Using this processes, scientists combined sodium dithionite with iron to treat Chrominum VI and TCE effectively.

Combining bacterial action and biological processes with iron is also known to be effective. The most evident uses of biological processes are with the EZVI technology created by NASA and with the EHC product created by Adventus. Both of these materials have iron within some biological matrix (iron is suspended in vegetable oil in EZVI and in organic carbon in EHC) and use microbial organisms to enhance the reduction zone and to create a more anaerobic environment for the reactions to take place in.

Implementation
The most common type of implementation of ISCR is the installation of permeable reactive barriers (PRBs), but there are instances when the reductant can be directly injected into the subsurface to treat source areas.

Semi-permeable reactive barrier

These barriers are usually made out of zero-valent iron (ZVI) but can also be made with any other zero-valent metal. The most common way they are made is by filling a trench with ZVI, nanoscale iron, or palladium. Nanoscale iron particles can also be injected directly into the subsurface to treat plumes, and they have large surface areas and, therefore, high reactivities and can be distributed more evenly in the contamination site. Palladium's reaction rates are rapid. The main advantages of PRBs are that it can reduce many a variety of contaminants and it has no above-ground structure. Problems with PRBs include that even with well constructed barriers, there might be the problem of hydraulic short-circuiting.

Direct injection of reductants
Nanoscale iron can be directly into the subsurface because they are small enough to be distributed thoroughly. Because the particles are so small, they have a comparatively large reactive surface, providing a more effective reaction. As of now, nanoscale iron is the only material that has been used with this injection strategy, and it is probably the only material that is effective in injection.

Future of ISCR
ISCR is a relatively new technology, so there much scope for research and improvement. Right now, although the reactions that make up ISCR have been studied extensively, there is not much background on what factors most contribute to the effectiveness of ISCR. One thing that needs to be done is find out exactly what reactions are taking place in the subsurface. ISCR is fairly more complex than ISCO because there are substances in the subsurface that will naturally reduce contaminants. The pathways that a contaminant can go through are consequently more diverse. Also, questions that need to be kept in mind are:
Which reducing agent will work best with a particular contaminant?
How can we improve the ISCR technology that is already commercially available?

References

External links
Additional information on this topic may be found at the following sites:
Adventus Group

Pollution control technologies
Soil contamination
Aquifers
Environmental science
Ecological restoration
Environmental issues with water
Water treatment